Mansfield Center can refer to a community in the United States:

Mansfield Center, Connecticut
Mansfield Center, Massachusetts